Brickeens may refer to:

 Brickeens, County Longford, a townland in Ireland
 Brickens, officially Brickeens, a village and townland in County Mayo in Ireland.